Cheyenne is a ghost town in Jackson Township, Osborne County, Kansas, United States.

History
Cheyenne was issued a post office in 1879.  The post office was discontinued in 1907.

References

Former populated places in Osborne County, Kansas
Former populated places in Kansas